A Statue of Ceres is a c.1615 oil on oak panel by Peter Paul Rubens, now in the Hermitage Museum in St Petersburg. It shows putti offering garlands to a statue of the Roman fertility goddess Ceres.

It was sold in the Hague for 1210 guilders in 1760 and eight years later was acquired in Brussels for the Hermitage from Carl de Coben's collection.

References

Mythological paintings by Peter Paul Rubens
1615 paintings
Paintings in the collection of the Hermitage Museum
Ceres (mythology)
Paintings of Roman goddesses